Titanic: The Long Night is a 1998 romance novel by Diane Hoh. It is an entirely fictional story set aboard the real ship, .

The plot centers around two main aspects. The first is the story of Elizabeth Farr. Elizabeth goes onboard the Titanic with her parents on a voyage to New York City to be engaged to Alen Hall, a man she does not wish to marry. While on the ship, she has frequent discussions with her parents about wanting to go to college and not wanting to marry Alan, but they refuse to let her make her own decisions. While on the ship, she meets Maxwell Whittaker, the son of the rich Whittaker family, and falls in love with him, against the will of her parents.

The plot also deals with the story of Kathleen Hanrahan, a girl who boards in Queenstown, Ireland. She falls in love with a man named Patrick "Paddy" Kelleher. She is also forced to take care of two young children, Kevin and Bridey, whose caretaker fails to pay attention to them.

On the night the Titanic crashes into the iceberg, Elizabeth forgets all of her troubles when she realizes that she has to leave Max and her father behind on the ship while it sinks. She gets in lifeboat number six with her mother, Nola.

Meanwhile, Katie wakes up in her third-class cabin all by herself. She finds Paddy, and he takes her, Kevin, and Bridey up to the boat deck, where they find Paddy's brother Brian. Brian refuses to get in a lifeboat and instead opts to stay behind, encouraging other people to get in boats before it is too late. Katie and Paddy get in a lifeboat while Brian stays behind.

Max and Elizabeth's father, still on the ship, retire to the gymnasium until Max goes outside. The ship suddenly starts to plunge into the water, and Max is washed off, presumably dead.

While Elizabeth, Nola, Katie, Paddy, and the rest of the people in the lifeboats watch, the  goes under water with more than 1,500 people in it. While on the ship, Elizabeth finds Max in the hospital room. Katie and Paddy are less fortunate, however, and have to face the fact that Brian is dead.

When they get to New York, Elizabeth goes to Vassar College and marries Max, while Paddy becomes a writer and marries Katie.

Fictional Characters 
Like the 1997 film, "Titanic: The Long Night," which made up some fictional passengers on the Titanic, Here is a list of them.

 Elizabeth Farr (first-class passenger, survives)
 Martin Farr (first-class passenger, Elizabeth's father, dies)
 Nola Farr (First Class Passenger, Elizabeth's Mother, Survives)
 Maxwell Whittaker (first-class passenger, survives)
 Lily (first-class passenger, survives)
 Kathleen Hanrahan (third-class passenger, survives)
 Patrick Kelleher (third-class passenger, survives)
 Brian Kelleher (third-class passenger, dies)
 Marta (Third Class, Survives)
 Eileen (Third Class, Survives)
 Kevin (Third Class, Survives)
 Bridey (Third Class, Survives)
 Arthur Beauchamps, First Class, dies

Remembering the Titanic 

Titanic: The Long Night was followed by a sequel, Remembering the Titanic, which was published later that same year and was also written by Diane Hoh. The book deals with the lives of Elizabeth, Max, Katie, and Paddy after the sinking. It has been one year since that fateful night on the Titanic. For the survivors, it is a constant struggle with grief and shock, as well as thoughts of those who didn't survive. Though he refuses to speak about the terrible night on the dark sea, Katie Hanrahan thinks Patrick "Paddy" Kelleher is happy. But Paddy can't stop thinking about what more he could've done to save his brother, Brian's, life. Max has embraced life as an artist, but he's losing his patience with Elizabeth, who is having trouble finding her independence. When Elizabeth sees the dark, brooding paintings Max has been working on furiously, she knows he is wrestling with the same problems that she is. Life for the Titanic survivors has been anything but easy. Will the pain and sadness of that disastrous night be with them forever?
1998 American novels
Novels about RMS Titanic
American romance novels